The Winsted Citizen is a newspaper published in Winsted, Connecticut. The paper was founded by Ralph Nader in 2022.

References

External links
 Official website

Newspapers published in Connecticut
Newspapers established in 2022